Sean Kekamakupaa Lee Loy Browne (born 1953) is a contemporary sculptor who was born in Hilo, Hawaii.  He attended the Kamehameha Schools and then earned a BA in studio art from the University of Redlands in 1975. 

In 1981, he studied marble carving in Pietrasanta, Italy and was later appointed an artist-in-residence at the Henraux Marble Company in Lucca, Italy.  He returned to Hawaii and earned an MFA in sculpture from the University of Hawaii at Manoa in 1983.
In 1985 he was awarded a Fulbright Fellowship, enabling him to study with Isamu Noguchi in Shikoku, Japan.  For many years, Browne taught sculpture at the University of Hawaii at Manoa and at Kapiolani Community College.

Browne is best known for monumental sight-specific sculptures (such as Spirit Way), but also created small works for indoor display (such as Ikaika).

Museum holdings and major commissions
 Ikaika (strong) (1980), cast bronze and black granite sculpture, Hawaii State Art Museum
 Ka Makau (1983), bronze sculpture, Keaukaha Elementary School, Hilo
 Ka Peahi IV (1983), sculpture, Hawaii State Art Museum
 Na Moku Ekolu (Three Islands) (1985), cast and welded silicon bronze sculpture, Maui Community College, Kahului
 Orpheus (1985), cast bronze, Honolulu Museum of Art 
 Spirit Way (1987), bronze sculpture, Kapiolani Community College, Honolulu
 Ua Mau Ke Ea O Ka Aina I Ka Pono (1988), Carrara marble sculpture, Wailuku Judiciary Complex, Maui
 Aina Lani (1989), black granite tile and stainless steel sculpture, Pali Momi Medical Center, Pearl City
 King David Kalakaua (1989–91), bronze sculpture, Waikiki Gateway Park, Honolulu
 Mahaina II (1990), bronze sculpture, The Honolulu Advertiser, Honolulu
 Lahui (1992), silicon bronze sheet sculpture, Kakaako Waterfront Park
 Lima Hoola (1993) basalt sculpture, Hawaii State Hospital, Kaneohe
 Pahoa (1995), basalt terrazzo sculpture, Pahoa High and Intermediate School, Pahoa
 Mahiole (2000), red granite sculpture, Kona International Airport, Kona
 Prince Jonah Kuhio Kalaniana 'ole (2001), bronze sculpture, Kuhio Beach Park, Waikiki
 Ka Makahiki (2003), bronze and brass sculpture, Maemae Elementary School, Oahu
 Ke Kaii (The Guardian) by Sean K. L. Browne, granite 2003, Hawaii State Art Museum's Sculpture Garden
 Parian Warrior (2005), carved marble sculpture, Honolulu Museum of Art

References
 Cazimero, Momi, David J. de la Torre and Manulani Aluli Meyer, Nā Maka Hou: New Visions, Honolulu Academy of Arts, Honolulu, 2001, pp. 32–33
 Hartwell, Patricia L. (editor), Retrospective 1967-1987, Hawaii State Foundation on Culture and the Arts, Honolulu, Hawaii, 1987, p. 134
 Yoshihara, Lisa A., Collective Visions, 1967-1997, An Exhibition Celebrating the 30th Anniversary of the State Foundation on Culture and the Arts, Art in Public Places Program, Presented at the Honolulu Academy of Arts, September 3-October 12, 1997, Honolulu, State Foundation on Culture and the Arts, 1997, pp. 150–151.

External links
  Art Inventories Catalog, Smithsonian American Art Museum

Footnotes

Modern sculptors
1953 births
Living people
People from Hilo, Hawaii
University of Redlands alumni
University of Hawaiʻi faculty
Sculptors from Hawaii
University of Hawaiʻi at Mānoa alumni